Inverness was a county constituency of the House of Commons of the Parliament of the United Kingdom from 1918 until 1983. It elected one Member of Parliament (MP) by the first-past-the-post system of election.

There was also a county constituency called Inverness-shire, 1708 to 1918, and a burgh constituency called Inverness Burghs, 1708 to 1918.

Boundaries 

The earlier Inverness-shire constituency covered, nominally, the county of Inverness minus the burgh of Inverness, which was a part of the Inverness Burghs constituency. By 1918, however, county boundaries were out of alignment with constituency boundaries.

In 1918, the Representation of the People Act 1918 created new constituency boundaries, taking account of new local government boundaries, and the new constituency boundaries were first used in the 1918 general election.

The new Inverness constituency included the burgh of Inverness and was one of three constituencies covering the county of 
Inverness and the county of Ross and Cromarty. The other two were the Ross and Cromarty constituency and the Western Isles constituency.

The Inverness constituency covered the county of Inverness minus Outer Hebridean areas (the districts of Harris, North Uist and South Uist), which were covered by the Western Isles constituency.  The same boundaries were used in every election from 1918 onwards.

In 1975, counties and burghs were abolished as local government areas, under the Local Government (Scotland) Act 1973, and from 1975 until 1983, the Inverness constituency was entirely within the Highland local government region.

For the 1983 general election, new boundaries defined three new constituencies to cover the region: Inverness, Nairn and Lochaber, Ross, Cromarty and Skye and Caithness and Sutherland. Each of the new constituencies covered a number of the districts of the region. The Caithness and Sutherland constituency carried forward the name of an older constituency.

Members of Parliament

Election results

Elections in the 1910s

Elections in the 1920s

Elections in the 1930s

Elections in the 1940s

Elections in the 1950s

Elections in the 1960s

Elections in the 1970s

Notes and references 

Historic parliamentary constituencies in Scotland (Westminster)
Constituencies of the Parliament of the United Kingdom established in 1918
Constituencies of the Parliament of the United Kingdom disestablished in 1983
Politics of the county of Inverness
Highland constituencies, UK Parliament (historic)